Leo Ernest Durocher (French spelling Léo Ernest Durocher) (July 27, 1905 – October 7, 1991), nicknamed "Leo the Lip" and "Lippy", was an American professional baseball player, manager and coach. He played in Major League Baseball as an infielder. Upon his retirement, he ranked fifth all-time among managers with 2,008 career victories, second only to John McGraw in National League history. Durocher still ranks tenth in career wins by a manager. A controversial and outspoken character, Durocher's half-century in baseball was dogged by clashes with authority, the baseball commissioner, the press, and umpires; his 95 career ejections as a manager trailed only McGraw when he retired, and still ranks fourth on the all-time list.

Durocher was posthumously elected to the Baseball Hall of Fame in 1994.

Early life
Leo Durocher was born in West Springfield, Massachusetts, on July 27, 1905, the youngest of four sons born to French Canadian parents.  His mother was a hotel maid and his father was a railroad engineer.  His parents were immigrants from Quebec and both they and Durocher's older brothers spoke only French; Durocher began attending elementary school without knowing how to speak English.

The Durochers lived only two blocks from Rabbit Maranville, who taught Durocher the game of baseball and gave him a glove.  Durocher became a good athlete while in high school, and was offered a scholarship to Holy Cross, but was suspended from school after he hit a teacher, and never returned.  Durocher became a prominent semi-professional athlete, with several Springfield-area employers competing to have him play on their company teams.

Playing career
After being scouted by the New York Yankees, Durocher broke into professional baseball with the Hartford Senators of the Eastern League in 1925. He was called up to the Yankees and played in two games. Durocher spent two more seasons in the minors, playing for the Atlanta Crackers of the Southern Association in 1926 and St. Paul Saints of the American Association in 1927.

Durocher rejoined the Yankees in 1928. A regular player, he was nicknamed "The All-American Out" by Babe Ruth. Durocher was a favorite of Yankee manager Miller Huggins, who considered Durocher a potential managerial candidate due to his competitiveness, passion, ego, and facility for remembering situations. Durocher's outspokenness did not endear him to Yankee ownership, however, and his habit of passing bad checks to finance his expensive tastes in clothes and nightlife annoyed Yankee general manager Ed Barrow.

Durocher helped the team win their second consecutive World Series title in 1928, then demanded a raise. He was later sold to the Cincinnati Reds on February 5, 1930. Durocher spent the remainder of his professional career in the National League.

After playing three seasons with the Reds, Durocher was traded to the St. Louis Cardinals in mid-1933. Upon joining the Cardinals he was assigned uniform number 2, which he wore for the rest of his career, as player, coach and manager. That team, whose famous nickname "Gashouse Gang" was supposedly inspired by Durocher, were a far more appropriate match for him; in St. Louis, Durocher's characteristics as a fiery player and vicious bench jockey were given full rein. Durocher remained with the Cardinals through the 1937 season, captaining the team and winning the 1934 World Series (their third title in nine years) before being traded to the Brooklyn Dodgers.

Primarily a shortstop, Durocher played through 1945, though his last year as a regular was 1939; after that year he never played more than 62 games in a season. He was known as a solid fielder but a poor hitter. In 5,350 career at bats, he batted .247, hit 24 home runs and had 567 runs batted in.

Durocher was named to the NL's All-Star team three times, once with St. Louis and twice with the Dodgers. In the 1938 game in Cincinnati, Durocher hit the only Little League Home Run in All-Star Game history.

Also in 1938, Durocher made history of a sort by making the final out in Johnny Vander Meer's second consecutive no-hitter.

Managing

Managerial career
After the 1938 season—Durocher's first year as Brooklyn's starting shortstop—he was appointed player-manager by the Dodgers' new president and general manager, Larry MacPhail. The two were a successful and combustible combination. MacPhail spared no expense in purchasing and trading for useful players (and sometimes outright stars), such as Dolph Camilli, Billy Herman and Kirby Higbe. He also purchased shortstop Pee Wee Reese from the Boston Red Sox. By the middle of the 1940 season, Reese impressed Durocher enough that he gave up his spot as the regular shortstop so Reese could get a chance to play, though Durocher would make "cameo" appearances in the lineup in 1943 and 1945. Other major purchases by MacPhail included another young star, Pete Reiser, when he was ruled a free agent from the Cardinals' farm system; and MacPhail found stalwarts such as American League veterans Dixie Walker and Whitlow Wyatt off the waiver wire.

In his first season as player-manager, Durocher came into his own. The most enduring image of Durocher is of him standing toe-to-toe with an umpire, vehemently arguing his case until his inevitable ejection from the game. Durocher's fiery temper and willingness to scrap came to epitomize the position for which he was to become most famous. As manager he valued these same traits in his players. His philosophy was best expressed in the phrase for which he is best, albeit inaccurately, remembered: "Nice guys finish last" (Durocher's actual phrasing "Nice guys, finish last" was a pair of clause fragments describing a team). Durocher once said, "Look at Mel Ott over there. He's a nice guy, and he finishes second. Now look at the Brat (Eddie Stanky). He can't hit, can't run, can't field. He's no nice guy, but all the little son-of-a-bitch can do is win."

Durocher was also notorious for ordering his pitchers to hit batters. Whenever he wanted a batter hit, he would yell, "Stick it in his ear!"

In 1939 the Dodgers were coming off six straight losing seasons, but Durocher led a quick turnaround. In 1941, his third season as manager, he led the Dodgers to a 100–54 record and the National League pennant, their first in 21 years. In the 1941 World Series the Dodgers lost to the Yankees in five games. They bettered their record in 1942, winning 104 games but just missing out on winning a second consecutive pennant.

Despite all the success of his first three years, Durocher and MacPhail had a tempestuous relationship. MacPhail was a notorious drinker, and he was as hot-tempered as his manager. He often fired Durocher in the midst of a night of drinking. The following morning, however, MacPhail inevitably hired Durocher back. Finally, at the end of the 1942 season, MacPhail's tenure with the Dodgers came to an end when he resigned to rejoin the United States Army. His replacement, former Cardinal boss Branch Rickey, retained Durocher as skipper. Durocher managed the Dodgers continuously through 1946 (having ceased as a player during the 1945 season), and led Brooklyn to the first postseason NL playoff series in history, where they lost to the Cardinals, two games to none.

Durocher also clashed regularly with Commissioner Albert "Happy" Chandler. Chandler, who had been named to the post in 1945, warned Durocher to stay away from some of his old friends who were gamblers, bookmakers, or had mob connections, and who had a free rein at Ebbets Field. Durocher was particularly close with actor George Raft, with whom he shared a Los Angeles house, and he admitted to a nodding acquaintance with Bugsy Siegel.

Durocher, who encouraged and participated in card schools within the clubhouse, was something of a pool shark himself and a friend to many pool hustlers. He also followed horse racing closely. Matters came to a head when Durocher's affair with married actress Laraine Day became public knowledge, drawing criticism from Brooklyn's influential Catholic Youth Organization. The two later eloped and married in Texas in 1947. In the 1950s, Day hosted a radio program called Day with the Giants, and later authored a book by the same title describing the life of a manager's wife.

Nice guys finish last

The saying "nice guys finish last" is a condensation by journalists of a quotation by Durocher—he did not originally say this himself, though it has often been attributed to him, and he did appropriate it as his own. The original quotation was "The nice guys are all over there, in seventh place" (July 6, 1946) about the 1946 New York Giants—seventh place was next to last place in the National League. This was shortly afterwards rendered as "'Nice Guys' Wind Up in Last Place, Scoffs Lippy", thence its present form. 

In his autobiography, Nice Guys Finish Last (1975), Durocher quoted himself incorrectly, 29 years afterward, as his sayings were contradicted by the contemporary records (see references above), although they show his philosophy, as epitomized in this maxim:

Durocher is also credited with popularizing the metaphorical use of the phrase "capture lightning in a bottle" in a baseball context—it had previously been used to literally refer to Benjamin Franklin's kite experiment.

Suspension
During spring training 1947, Durocher became involved in a very unpleasant feud with Larry MacPhail, who had become a new co-owner of the Yankees. The Yankee boss had hired away two coaches from Durocher's 1946 staff (Chuck Dressen and Red Corriden) during the off-season, causing friction. Then, matters got worse.

In person, Durocher and MacPhail exchanged a series of accusations and counter-accusations, with each suggesting the other invited gamblers into their clubhouses. In the press, a ghostwritten article appeared under Durocher's name in the Brooklyn Eagle, seeking to stir the rivalry between their respective clubs and accusing baseball of a double standard for Chandler's warning him against his associations but not MacPhail or other baseball executives.

Chandler was pressured by MacPhail, a close friend who was pivotal in having him appointed commissioner, but the commissioner also discovered Durocher and Raft might have run a rigged craps game that swindled an active ballplayer of a large sum of money. (The player's identity was never confirmed officially, but a former Detroit Tiger pitcher, Elden Auker, wrote in his 2002 memoir that it was a then-current Tiger pitcher, Dizzy Trout.) Chandler suspended Durocher for the 1947 season for "association with known gamblers".

Before being suspended, however, Durocher played a noteworthy role in erasing baseball's color line. In the spring of 1947, he let it be known that he would not tolerate the dissent of those players on the team who opposed Jackie Robinson's joining the club, saying:

I do not care if the guy is yellow or black, or if he has stripes like a fuckin' zebra. I'm the manager of this team, and I say he plays. What's more, I say he can make us all rich. And if any of you cannot use the money, I will see that you are all traded.

He greatly admired Robinson for his hustle and aggression, calling him "a Durocher with talent."

While Durocher sat out his suspension, the Dodgers went on to win the National League pennant under an interim skipper, scout Burt Shotton. They then went on to lose the 1947 World Series to MacPhail's Yankees in seven games.

Move to New York Giants (1948–1955)

Durocher returned for the 1948 season, but his outspoken personality and a 35-37 start again caused friction with Rickey, and on July 16 Durocher, Rickey and New York Giants owner Horace Stoneham negotiated a deal whereby Durocher was let out of his Brooklyn contract to take over the Dodgers' cross-town rivals. He enjoyed perhaps his greatest success with the Giants, and possibly a measure of sweet revenge against the Dodgers, as the Giants won the 1951 NL pennant in a playoff against Brooklyn, ultimately triumphing on Bobby Thomson's historic game-winning  "Shot 'Heard 'Round The World" home run.

Later with the Giants in 1954, Durocher won his only World Series championship as a manager by sweeping the heavily favored Cleveland Indians, who posted the highest American League winning percentage of all time (111–43) during the regular season.

Alvin Dark, who played under Durocher during this period, admired his manager. He thought that Durocher's strength was letting veterans play according to their strengths, then supporting them. An aggressive manager, he either succeeded in getting the best out of players or getting nothing out of them, depending on how they responded. "If you stood up for Leo publicly, he'd go to the wall for you. He'd take the blame for every mistake you made, and expose himself to the criticism."

After leaving the Giants following the 1955 season, Durocher became an executive at NBC. He was a color commentator on the Major League Baseball on NBC and host of The NBC Comedy Hour and Jackpot Bowling. He later served as a coach for the Dodgers, by then relocated to Los Angeles, from 1961 to 1964.

During this period, Durocher, who had made his screen debut in the 1943 Red Skelton comedy Whistling in Brooklyn, played himself in many television shows. Durocher appeared on the CBS game show What's My Line? twice as a mystery guest (January 28, 1951 and May 31, 1953), the latter when his wife Day was a guest panelist.In an April 10, 1963 airing of The Beverly Hillbillies, Durocher plays golf with Jed Clampett (Buddy Ebsen) and Jethro Bodine (Max Baer, Jr.) and tries to sign Jethro to a baseball contract after discovering Jethro has a strong pitching arm. In 1964, he appeared as himself in an episode of Mr. Ed, when the talking horse gave batting tips to the Los Angeles Dodgers, helping them win the pennant. In an episode of The Munsters titled "Herman the Rookie," on April 8, 1965, Durocher believes Herman (Fred Gwynne) is the next Mickey Mantle when he sees the towering Munster hit long home runs. Football great Elroy Hirsch also appears with Durocher.

Chicago Cubs (1966–1972)
Durocher returned to the managerial ranks in 1966 with the Chicago Cubs. In several previous seasons, the Cubs had tried an experiment called the "College of Coaches", in which they were led by a "head coach" rather than a manager. However, at his first press conference, Durocher formally announced an end to the experiment by saying:

At the same press conference, Durocher declared, "I am not the manager of an eighth place team." He was right; the Cubs finished tenth in his first season, becoming the first team to finish behind the previously hapless New York Mets. In 1967, however, the Cubs started strongly and had only their second winning season since 1946. The team steadily improved, but in 1969, Durocher suffered one of his most remembered failures. The Cubs started the season on a tear, and led the newly created National League East for 105 days. By mid-August they had a seemingly insurmountable nine-game cushion, and they appeared to be a shoo-in for their first postseason appearance in 25 years. However, they floundered down the stretch, losing 25 of their last 40 games, and finished eight games behind the "Miracle Mets".

In a mid-July series against the Mets, the Cubs were beaten in the first two games at Shea Stadium, but finally managed to salvage the third game, after which Durocher was asked if those were the real Cubs.

'"No", Durocher answered, "those are the real Mets."

Part of Durocher's problem was that, while the Cubs were playing well in 1969, he began starting their best pitchers on two or three days' rest. While this led to immediate success, it exhausted the pitchers in the long run, resulting in poorer performance later in the season.

While with the Cubs, Durocher encountered a difficult dilemma in regard to aging superstar Ernie Banks. While Banks' bad knees made him a liability, his legendary status made benching him impossible. Durocher also nearly came to blows with Cubs star Ron Santo during an infamous clubhouse near-riot. The problems were symbolic of Durocher's difficulty in managing the new breed of wealthier, more outspoken players who had come up during his long career. With a mediocre record of 46–44, Durocher was fired midway through the 1972 season, later stating that his greatest regret in baseball was not being able to win a pennant for longtime Cubs owner Philip K. Wrigley.

Later career (1972-73, 1976)
Durocher managed the Houston Astros for the final 31 games of the 1972 season (posting a 16–15 record in that span), replacing Harry Walker while being tapped by general manager Spec Richardson in the belief that he could lead the Astros to a pennant.  He would manage just one full season (1973), posting an 82–80 record despite dealing with intestinal problems (Preston Gomez stepped in to manage a portion of the season in his absence) as the Astros finished a middling fourth as Durocher drew the ire of multiple people that ranged from players such as Larry Dierker to Marvin Miller.  On October 1, he resigned as manager, despite requests from  Richardson to stay another year (Gomez was named his successor). Durocher stated upon his retirement, “Baseball has been 45 years of a wonderful life. But I have got a lot of things to do now. I'm going out to Palm Springs and I'm going to tee it up and play a lot of golf.”

He made a brief comeback in 1976 in the Japanese Pacific League with the Taiheiyo Club Lions, but he retired due to illness (hepatitis) before the beginning of the season.

Dark thought that Durocher's managerial style changed in the 1960s and 1970s. Instead of making moves regardless of how others felt about them, he began to make what Dark called "safe" decisions. Dark thought that openly negative comments by Cubs players during the 1969 season "really hurt Leo", and that by managing games more safely, he stopped using the style that had once been successful for him.

Retirement
Durocher finished his managerial career with a 2,008–1,709 record for a .540 winning percentage. He posted a winning record with each of the four teams he led, and was the first manager to win 500 games with three different clubs.

Durocher, with Ed Linn, wrote a memoir titled Nice Guys Finish Last, a book that was recently re-published by the University of Chicago Press.

Leo Durocher died in 1991 in Palm Springs, California, at the age of 86, and is buried in Forest Lawn, Hollywood Hills Cemetery in Los Angeles. He was posthumously inducted into the Baseball Hall of Fame in 1994. His third wife Laraine Day accepted the honor of speaking on his behalf for the ceremony.

Managerial record

Personal life
Durocher was married four times. He was married to Ruby Hartley from 1930 to 1934. He was married to St. Louis socialite Grace Dozier from 1934 to 1943. In 1947 he married actress Laraine Day, and they divorced in 1960. His fourth wife was Lynne Walker Goldblatt, to whom he was married from 1969 to 1980.

In 1943, Durocher was deemed ineligible for service in World War II due to a punctured eardrum.

With Ruby Hartley, Durocher had a daughter named Barbara (born 1931).

He adopted two children with Day, daughter Melinda Michele (1944–2012) and son Chris (born 1945). Willie Mays used to babysit Chris on Giants' roadtrips—the two would room together and go see movies as well.

Durocher had real comedic talent, and portrayed himself on episodes of The Munsters, The Joey Bishop Show, Mister Ed, The Beverly Hillbillies, Screen Directors Playhouse, and other shows.

In the 2013 film 42 about Jackie Robinson, Durocher is played by Christopher Meloni.

See also

 List of Major League Baseball player–managers
 List of Major League Baseball managers by wins
 The Victory Season: The End of World War II and the Birth of Baseball's Golden Age

Bibliography

 Nice Guys Finish Last, by Leo Durocher with Ed Linn. Durocher's forthright autobiography was recently re-published by the University of Chicago Press.
 Bums: An Oral History of the Brooklyn Dodgers, by Peter Golenbock
 Prager, Joshua. (2006). The Echoing Green: The Untold Story of Bobby Thomson, Ralph Branca and the Shot Heard Round the World. New York: Random House.
  Dickson, Paul:   Leo Durocher: Baseball's Prodigal Son (2017) Bloomsbury USA

References

External links

NY Times obituary – July 27 'On This Day'
A 16-page excerpt from Durocher's autobiography, Nice Guys Finish Last

1905 births
1991 deaths
Brooklyn Dodgers managers
Brooklyn Dodgers players
Bowling broadcasters
Burials at Forest Lawn Memorial Park (Hollywood Hills)
Chicago Cubs managers
Cincinnati Reds players
Expatriate baseball managers in Japan
American people of French-Canadian descent
Houston Astros managers
Los Angeles Dodgers coaches
Major League Baseball broadcasters
Baseball players from Massachusetts
Major League Baseball shortstops
Major League Baseball third base coaches
National Baseball Hall of Fame inductees
National League All-Stars
New York Giants (NL) managers
New York Yankees players
People from West Springfield, Massachusetts
St. Louis Cardinals players
Taiheiyo Club Lions
Hartford Senators players
Atlanta Crackers players
St. Paul Saints (AA) players
Major League Baseball player-managers
Du